is an area of Tsurumi-ku, Yokohama, Kanagawa Prefecture. The pier was built as a freight base, but it also functions as a transportation hub for traffic around the Port of Yokohama.  It is an access point for the Shuto Expressway and a docking point for large cruise ships. Since it is a hub for a wide variety of economic activities, huge bridges such as the Daikoku Ohashi Bridge and Yokohama Bay Bridge have been built.

References

Artificial islands of Japan
Geography of Yokohama
Piers in Japan
Tokyo Bay